Kukatja or Gugadja may be,

The Kukatja dialect of the Western Desert language spoken south of Balgo, Western Australia
The Luritja dialect of the Western Desert Language, spoken in the Northern Territory
The Kukatj language of Queensland